Callidium schotti is a species of beetle in the family Cerambycidae. It was described by Schaeffer in 1917.

References

Callidium
Beetles described in 1917